James Russell Lowell School is a historic elementary school located in the Olney neighborhood of Philadelphia, Pennsylvania. It is part of the School District of Philadelphia. The building was designed by Henry deCourcy Richards and built in 1913–1914. It is a three-story, five bay reinforced concrete building with brick facing and granite and terra cotta trim in a Classical Revival-style. It features decorative panels and a center entrance topped by an entablature. The school was named for American Romantic poet, critic, editor, and diplomat James Russell Lowell (1819-1891).

The building was added to the National Register of Historic Places in 1988.

References

External links

School buildings on the National Register of Historic Places in Philadelphia
Neoclassical architecture in Pennsylvania
School buildings completed in 1914
Olney-Oak Lane, Philadelphia
Elementary schools in Philadelphia
School District of Philadelphia
1914 establishments in Pennsylvania